Jan William Joslin "John" Rinkel (24 March 1905 – 13 March 1975) was an English sprinter. He competed in the 400 m and 4 × 400 m relay events at the 1928 Summer Olympics and placed fourth and fifth, respectively. Rinkel won the 440 yd Amateur Athletic Association of England (AAA) title in 1926, and placed second in 1928. He was a member of the Achilles team that won the AAA medley relay in 1926 and the 4×440 yd relay in 1928–29.

References

1905 births
1975 deaths
Sportspeople from Hilversum
British male sprinters
Olympic athletes of Great Britain
Athletes (track and field) at the 1928 Summer Olympics
Dutch emigrants to the United Kingdom